The Utah Valley Wolverines men's basketball team is the basketball team that represents Utah Valley University in Orem, Utah, United States. The school's team currently competes in the Western Athletic Conference.

Seasons

 Before 2003 Utah Valley State College was a Junior College. They received approval to begin transition to D1 status in Spring 2003. JC transitions to D1 require a 6-year transition period, meaning they weren't eligible for NCAA or NIT Tournament appearances until the 2009–10 season. 
 The Great West Conference announced the teams that were invited to join their conference during spring 2008. However most of the teams already had scheduled Independent schedules for the 2008–2009 season, so the conference held off on scheduling regular season matches and a conference tournament until 2009–10.

Postseason results

NIT results
The Wolverines have appeared in the National Invitation Tournament (NIT) two times. Their combined record is 2–1.

CIT results
The Wolverines have appeared in the CollegeInsider.com Postseason Tournament (CIT) one time. Their record is 0–1.

CBI results
The Wolverines have appeared in the College Basketball Invitational (CBI) three times. Their combined record is 4–3.

Wolverines in the NBA
3 former Utah Valley players have played at least one game in the NBA.

References

External links
Website